"Get Up! (Before the Night Is Over)" is a song by Belgian musical group Technotronic featuring Ya Kid K. It was released in January 1990 as the second single from the band's debut album, Pump Up the Jam: The Album (1989), on which it features as the second track. The single was successful in many countries, becoming a top 10 hit in Australia, Canada, and the US and topping the chart in Belgium, Finland, Spain and Switzerland. When the song entered the UK chart at number three, it completed the first ever UK top 3 composed entirely of acts from outside the UK or US, alongside the Australian Kylie Minogue and the Irish Sinéad O'Connor.

In 1998 and 1999, it was re-released respectively under the title "Get Up (the '98 Sequel)" and "Get Up (the 1999 Sequel)". The song appears in Dance Dance Revolution Ultramix 4 and Dance Dance Revolution 3rd Mix. It contains a vocal sample of James Brown's "Get Up, Get Into It, Get Involved". 
In 2007, the song was covered by Global Deejays (featuring Technotronic) who achieved a minor success in France.

Chart performance
"Get Up! (Before the Night Is Over" was a sizeable hit on the charts on several continents. It peaked at number-one in Belgium, Finland, Spain and Switzerland, as well as on the Eurochart Hot 100. In addition, it reached number two in Austria, France, West Germany, Ireland, the Netherlands and the United Kingdom. In the latter, it peaked in its second week at the UK Singles Chart, on 4 February 1990. It was held off reaching the top spot by Sinead O'Connor's "Nothing Compares 2 U". Outside Europe, the single reached number-one on the Canadian RPM Dance/Urban chart as well as in Zimbabwe. On the US Billboard Hot 100, "Get Up!" managed to reach number seven while on the Billboard Hot Dance Club Play chart, it peaked at number two. In both Australia and New Zealand, it went to number seven. 

The song was awarded with a gold record in the US, after 500,000 singles were sold, and a silver record in France and the UK, with a sale of 205,000 and 200,000 units.

Critical reception
Upon the release, Bill Coleman from Billboard felt the song is "not as catchy" as the group's breakthrough smash. Greg Kot from Chicago Tribune complimented rapper Ya Kid K's phrasing as "exotically enthusiastic and seductive", noting that catch phrases such as "Get up, get busy" "have become as ubiquitous as black leather miniskirts at dance clubs from Los Angeles to Berlin." A reviewer from Daily Mirror declared it as a "pounding" dance-floor track. Everett True from Melody Maker said, "This goes "git down/Mmm, get up-per" so many times you begin to wonder if the participants are involved in a particularly strenuous brand of press-up's." Pan-European magazine Music & Media commented, "Can they do it again? It certainly seems that way. This is less rap and more of an orthodox pop song. A strong chorus and one of the biggest bass sounds around. Excellent." John Leland from Newsday wrote that it "brings to the mainstream both cult sounds and cult ideology: It is more than anything a remix of the smash hit "Pump Up the Jam", with a new rap by the enticingly vulgar-sounding Zairean rapper Ya Kid K. This is Donna Summer's "I Feel Love" for the '90s: sinister, avant-garde, irresistible: a private fetish made public." Parry Gettelman from The Sentinel named it a "standout" dance track of the album.

Retrospective response
In an retrospective review, AllMusic editor Alex Henderson described the song as "highly infectious". Nicole Leedham from The Canberra Times remarked that "Get Up! (Before the Night Is Over)", along with "Pump Up the Jam", were pushing the envelope of dance music in the late '80s. In an 2015 review, Pop Rescue stated that the song "isn’t so dissimilar" to "Pump Up the Jam", "although plays more on the bass line, and gives Ya Kid K the vocalist credit that she works hard to earn – rapping, singing and writing the song."

Music video
A music video was produced to promote the single, directed by Liam Kan. It features model Felly lipsynching the chorus with blue lipstick and De Quincey playing the keyboards in the background. As of December 2022, the video had generated more than 56 million views on YouTube.

Track listings

Original version

 CD maxi
 "Get Up! (Before the Night Is Over)" (dance action mix) — 6:00
 "Get Up! (Before the Night Is Over)" (single mix) — 3:51
 "Get Up! (Before the Night Is Over)" (muted mix) — 5:52
 "Get Up! (Before the Night Is Over)" (CD version) — 5:54

 7-inch single
 "Get Up! (Before the Night Is Over)" (single mix) — 3:51
 "Get Up! (Before the Night Is Over)" (instrumental) — 3:12

 12-inch maxi
 "Get Up! (Before The Night Is Over)" (dance action mix) — 6:00
 "Get Up! (Before The Night Is Over)" (muted mix) — 5:52
 "Get Up! (Before The Night Is Over)" (def mix) — 8:12
 "Get Up! (Before The Night Is Over)" (accapella) — 2:47
 "Get Up! (Before The Night Is Over)" (instrumental) — 5:51

 US 12-inch maxi
 "Get Up! (Before The Night Is Over)" (def mix) — 8:12
 "Get Up! (Before The Night Is Over)" (album mix) — 4:47
 "Get Up! (Before The Night Is Over)" (7" edit) — 3:30
 "Get Up! (Before The Night Is Over)" (far east mix) — 5:58
 "Pump Up The Jam" (techno mix) — 4:48

 US and Canadian 7-inch
 "Get Up! (Before The Night Is Over)" (7" edit) — 3:30
 "Raw" — 4:47

 Cassette Single "Get Up! (Before the Night Is Over)"
 "Raw"

The '98 Sequel version
 CD maxi "Get Up" (radio version) — 3:38
 "Get Up" (radio sequel) — 3:42
 "Get Up" (clubbing mix) — 5:49
 "Get Up" (pulsar mix) — 5:15
 "Pump up the Jam" (the sequel - dancing divaz master mix) — 5:35

2007 version
 CD maxi'''
 "Get Up (Before the Night Is Over)" (general electric version) — 6:22
 "Get Up (Before the Night Is Over)" (flash brothers remix) — 7:39
 "Get Up (Before the Night Is Over)" (tribalectric rap mix) — 6:05
 "Get Up (Before The Night Is Over)" (Maurizio Gubellini Remix)		7:24
 "Get Up (Before The Night Is Over)" (Global Deejays Remix)

Versions

 "Get Up! (Before the Night Is Over)" (7" edit) — 3:30
 "Get Up! (Before the Night Is Over)" (accapella) — 2:47
 "Get Up! (Before the Night Is Over)" (album mix) — 4:47
 "Get Up! (Before the Night Is Over)" (CD version) — 5:54
 "Get Up! (Before the Night Is Over)" (dance action mix) — 6:00
 "Get Up! (Before the Night Is Over)" (def mix) — 8:12
 "Get Up! (Before the Night Is Over)" (Dm's live mix) — 9:15
 "Get Up! (Before the Night Is Over)" (far east mix) — 5:58
 "Get Up! (Before the Night Is Over)" (instrumental) — 5:51
 "Get Up! (Before the Night Is Over)" (lost mix) — 5:54
 "Get Up! (Before the Night Is Over)" (mental mix) — 5:42
 "Get Up! (Before the Night Is Over)" (muted mix) — 5:52
 "Get Up! (Before the Night Is Over)" (single mix) — 3:51
 "Get Up! (Before the Night Is Over)" (techno mix) — 4:48
 "Get Up! (Before the Night Is Over)" (the Wind command mix) — 6:50

Charts and certifications

Weekly charts

Technotronic version

Global Deejays version

Year-end charts

Technotronic version

Global Deejays version

Certifications

References

1989 songs
1990 singles
1998 singles
1999 singles
2007 singles
Technotronic songs
European Hot 100 Singles number-one singles
Number-one singles in Belgium
Number-one singles in Finland
Number-one singles in Switzerland
Number-one singles in Zimbabwe
Songs about dancing
SBK Records singles
EMI Records singles
English-language Belgian songs
Music videos directed by Liam Kan
Songs written by Jo Bogaert